Boy's Town, (or "La Zona" (en: the Zone) as it is known in Spanish), is a commercial district in the border town of Nuevo Laredo, Tamaulipas, Mexico, serving primarily as a "zone of tolerance" in the city for legal prostitution, and also a variety of other nocturnal entertainment.  It is a walled compound containing three short east-west streets and two short north-south streets.  It houses a range of brothels, bars, restaurants, small stores, a small police station, and a health clinic. It is located near the intersection of Monterrey and Anahuac Streets, about 5 km southwest of International Bridge #1. Providencia Cantu was the one who came up with the name. She used to own a place there named "El Baston".

Historical precedent
The origins of the Boy's Town concept along the Mexico–United States border can be traced in part to the relationship that developed between the United States Army and various ad hoc entrepreneurs in northern Mexico during the army's 1916–17 Punitive Expedition; specifically when General John J. Pershing's forces were pursuing General Pancho Villa in Chihuahua.  While the troops were based 100 kilometers south of Ciudad Juárez, Chihuahua, at Colonia Dublain, a small group of vendors, launderers, barkeeps, and prostitutes set up businesses next to the army camp.  Eventually, General Pershing ordered that the prostitutes be restricted to the southern end of the camp where they would be inspected and certified by the military medical officers.  A flat rate for sexual intercourse was also established.

Within a few decades, this concept was adopted by vice entrepreneurs and city managers elsewhere along the border. These enclosed compounds, called zonas de tolerancia or Boy's Towns, were eventually established in at least seven Mexican cities along the U.S.-Mexico border
(San Luis Río Colorado, Agua Prieta, Ojinaga, Ciudad Acuña, Piedras Negras, Nuevo Laredo, and Reynosa).  Later, several other cities, not located on the border, established enclosed zonas as well, including Sabinas Hidalgo, Nuevo León, and Salina Cruz, Oaxaca.  The government of Ciudad Victoria, Mexico, has considered establishing a similar zone.

The current enclave in Nuevo Laredo was constructed in the 1960s, during the municipal administration of Ernesto Ferrara Ferrara, to concentrate prostitution activities within a controlled zone.  A number of brothels and bars catering to prostitution still operate in the downtown area outside Boy's Town with the tacit approval of the government.

Description

The commercial activities can be differentiated into a number of broad categories, and their spatial organization is outlined in the map.  The categories include: (1) primary or major brothels, (2) secondary brothels, (3) "cribs" of freelance prostitutes, (4) cantinas and bars catering to local patrons, (5) transvestite bars, (6) other commercial services, and (7) residences.  Furthermore, Boy's Town is protected by a substation of the municipal police complete with jail, and there is a health clinic that performs blood tests and weekly screenings of sex workers for venereal diseases.

Establishments and services exhibit a typical distance decay pattern. All but one of the primary brothels are located near the entrance, secondary brothels and cantinas are located farther from the entrance, and the transvestite bars are concentrated at the far end of the compound.  Even the cribs exhibit a distance-decay pattern in that the younger more attractive prostitutes occupy cribs on the central lane (Cleopatra Street), whereas older, or less attractive women rent cribs on the south most lane or in the back near the transvestite bars.  This pattern is primarily a function of rental rates for the cribs; being less expensive in the southwest corner of the compound.

Cantinas and bars
The cantinas and bars constitute a significant component of the economy.  Most do not operate as brothels, but are instead venues for inexpensive drinks (usually just beer and tequila), live music, and dancing.  Some are staffed with women who dance with customers for a few pesos.  They provide an inexpensive environment for local males (and occasionally couples) to relax, listen to Cumbia, Norteño, or Ranchera music, and dance late into the night.  Several are patronized by off-duty prostitutes and their boyfriends or husbands after working hours in the early morning.

Some transvestite bars also serve as brothels catering to clients who seek to have sex with transvestites, transgender individuals, or homosexual men.  They also serve as social entertainment venues for local transvestites and homosexual men themselves.  Customers are almost exclusively local males.

Other commercial services
In addition to entertainment facilities, a number of small restaurants and street eateries cater to patrons visiting the bars and brothels and to the individuals who live and work there. Other services include small convenience stores, clothing stores, seamstress shops that tailor outfits for the sex workers, and a photo studio.

While accurate figures of the total number of individuals residing in Boy's Town are not available, they range into the hundreds. Many sex workers reside in the brothels, cribs, or other rented rooms. Some workers live with their boyfriends or husbands in these rooms.  Furthermore, several bar owners or managers live there.

Employment patterns

Employment in prostitution is more transitional and seasonal than other occupations within Boy's Town. For example, most of the waiters, bartenders, and shopkeepers retain their jobs for years, if not decades.  These individuals also have fairly set schedules, and their employment reflects little seasonality. In contrast, most prostitutes work in Boy's Town for no more than two or three years, usually in times of severe economic need. Approximately 30% stay between 5 and 8 years, and only 5% may stay for as many as ten years. Prostitutes tend to work during specific periods and to travel frequently between their home states in Mexico and Nuevo Laredo. Many work only on weekends and commute via bus to homes in interior Mexico. Some work for several weeks each month, while others come for several months each year.  Generally, prostitutes from Monterrey adopt the weekly schedule, whereas those from farther south employ longer-interval patterns. Most prostitutes arrive as a result of chain migration, following the migration of family members (e. g., sisters or cousins) or acquaintances who already work in Boy's Town. According to one local municipal health official, approximately 800 prostitutes work in Boy's Town (albeit not at the same time).

Significance

Boy's Town was referenced during the 1990 Texas gubernatorial race when Republican candidate Clayton Williams admitted that he had made visits for "servicing."

Scholarly analysis of Boy's Town has been limited to a sociological study in the 1970s (Stevenson 1975) and several geographical surveys in the early 1990s (Arreola and Curtis 1993, Curtis and Arreola 1991a, Curtis and Arreola 1991b).

See also
 Prostitution in Mexico

References

 Boystown : la zona de tolerancia / with essays by Cristina Pacheco, Dave Hickey, and Keith Carter; afterword by Bill Wittliff. New York : Aperture, in association with the Wittliff Gallery of Southwestern & Mexican Photography, c2000. 108 p. : chiefly ill.; 27 x 30 cm. 
 Arreola, Daniel D., and Curtis, James R., The Mexican Border Cities: Landscape Anatomy and Place Personality (1993). Tucson: University of Arizona Press.  
 
 Stevenson, Robert J., La Zona in Transition: Bordertown Prostitution in Frontier City, Mexico (1975). Unpublished M.A. thesis, State University of New York at Stony Brook. This project has been expanded and was published as A Mexican Border Prostitution Community During the Late Vietnam Era: La Zona. Edwin Mellen Press. New York. 2005. Detailed maps of the site, the region, and photographs (circa 1972) appear in Appendix A.
Map: 

Red-light districts in Mexico
Nuevo Laredo